The Aston Martin Vantage is a 1972-73 British sports car. Other vehicles of this name include:
 1951–1953 DB2 Vantage
 1961–1963 DB4 Vantage
 1963–1965 DB5 Vantage
 1965–1969 DB6 Vantage
 1977–1989 V8 Vantage
 1986–1989 V8 Vantage Volante
 1988–1990 V8 Vantage Zagato
 1992–1999 V8 Vantage (Virage)
 1998 Project Vantage (an early concept for the Vanquish)
 1999–2003 DB7 V12 Vantage
 2005–2018 V8 Vantage
 2009–2018 V12 Vantage
 2019– V8 Vantage
 2022– V12 Vantage

Vantage